In discrete mathematics, a walk-regular graph is a simple graph where the number of closed walks of any length from a vertex to itself does not depend on the choice of vertex.

Equivalent definitions 
Suppose that  is a simple graph.
  is walk-regular.
  is a constant-diagonal matrix for all 
  for all

Examples 
 The vertex-transitive graphs are walk-regular.
 The semi-symmetric graphs are walk-regular.
 The distance-regular graphs are walk-regular. More generally, any simple graph in a homogeneous coherent algebra is walk-regular.
 A connected regular graph is walk-regular if:
 It has at most four distinct eigenvalues.
 It is triangle-free and has at most five distinct eigenvalues.
 It is bipartite and has at most six distinct eigenvalues.

Properties 
 A walk-regular graph is necessarily a regular graph.
 Complements of walk-regular graphs are walk-regular.
 Cartesian products of walk-regular graphs are walk-regular.
 Categorical products of walk-regular graphs are walk-regular.
 Strong products of walk-regular graphs are walk-regular.
 In general, the line graph of a walk-regular graph is not walk-regular.

References

External links 
 Chris Godsil and Brendan McKay, Feasibility conditions for the existence of walk-regular graphs.

Algebraic graph theory
Graph families
Regular graphs